was a town located in Shimomashiki District, Kumamoto Prefecture, Japan.

As of 2003, the town had an estimated population of 25,166 and the density of 659.66 persons per km². The total area was 38.15 km².

On January 15, 2005, Matsubase, along with the towns of Misumi and Shiranuhi (both from Uto District), and the towns of Ogawa and Toyono (all from Shimomashiki District), was merged to create the city of Uki and no longer exists as an independent municipality.

External links
 Official website of Uki 

Dissolved municipalities of Kumamoto Prefecture